Santo Antônio de Pádua (Saint Anthony of Padua) is a municipality located in the northeastern part of the Brazilian state of Rio de Janeiro. Its population was 42,594 (2020) and its area is 612 km².

Districts

Santo Antônio de Pádua (seat)
Baltazar
Campelo
Ibitiguaçu
Marangatu
Monte Alegre
Paraoquena
Santa Cruz

Neighboring municipalities

Miracema
São José de Ubá
Cambuci
Aperibé
Itaocara
Pirapetinga (MG)

Coat of arms

The coat of arms of Santo Antônio de Pádua features eight stars representing eight of its districts on a navy blue field of the shield with a tree on the right and a fountain in the middle.  The municipality's name is centered in the shield and it runs diagonally from bottom left to top right.  The shield is bordered with four orange rectangles on each side.  The crown is on the top of the coat of arms.

External links
 Santo Antônio de Pádua City Hall

References

Municipalities in Rio de Janeiro (state)